Midwood Hospital opened in 1907 as Midwood Sanitarium. It closed in the 1970s, and its building served as a private school from 1979 thru 2000.

History
The original four-story Midwood Sanitarium wood structure was replaced and renamed in 1929, after a fire, with a fireproof building that used more of the grounds and could treat more patients. It received repeat business for births, and was noted for "bright and cheery colors" as "a relief from endless white walls."

From 1979 to 2000 it housed St. John's Elementary School, a private school.

The next use for the 19 Winthrop Street building, still continuing as of 2021, is via CAMBA, Inc.,
a city-funded social services organization.

References

  

Defunct hospitals in Brooklyn